The Japan's Billboard Hot 100 is a chart that ranks the best-performing singles in Japan. The data is published by Billboard magazine and compiled by Nielsen SoundScan, is based collectively on each single's weekly physical and digital sales, as well as airplay and streaming. At the end of a year, Billboard will publish an annual list of the 100 most successful songs throughout that year on the Hot 100 chart based on the information on performance. For 2017, the list was published on December 8.

Year-end list

References

Billboard charts
2017 in Japanese music